Prusias may refer to :

People
Two kings of ancient Bithynia
 Prusias I of Bithynia
 Prusias II of Bithynia

Places and jurisdictions
 Prusias ad Hypium, city in the Roman province of Honorias
 Prusias and Prusias ad Mare, former alternate names for the ancient city of Cius in Bithynia

Other
 Prusias (spider), a spider genus in the family Sparassidae

See also 
 Monument of Prusias II
 Prusa (disambiguation)
 Prussia